St. Mary's Church is a parish in the Diocese of the Central Gulf Coast of the Episcopal Church based in Milton, Florida. It is noted for its historic Carpenter Gothic-style church and its adjacent rectory, also known as the McDougall House, located at 300 Oak Street, now 6841 Oak Street. On May 6, 1982, it was added to the U.S. National Register of Historic Places as "St. Mary's Episcopal Church and Rectory."

The congregation first met for worship on August 4, 1867. The current church opened for services in 1878. As with other Carpenter Gothic churches, features of the Gothic Revival style have been executed in wood, such as its lancet windows, decorative bargeboards, and finials.

In 1989, St. Mary's Episcopal Church was listed in A Guide to Florida's Historic Architecture, published by the University of Florida Press. The listing quotes from Frank Lloyd Wright's book, The Aesthetics of American Architecture, in which he wrote: "Saint Mary's is a jewel created in the purest tradition of the Gothic Revival. It survives today wirh its pure lines intact, its muted colors untouched. Purity, it is without a blemish."

The church celebrated its sesquicentennial anniversary in 2017.

See also

 List of Registered Historic Places in Santa Rosa County, Florida https://stmarysmilton.wixsite.com/church

References

External links
 Santa Rosa County listings at National Register of Historic Places
 Florida's Office of Cultural and Historical Programs
 Santa Rosa County listings at Florida's Office of Cultural and Historical Programs
 St. Marys Episcopal Church and Rectory

Gallery

Carpenter Gothic church buildings in Florida
Episcopal church buildings in Florida
Churches on the National Register of Historic Places in Florida
National Register of Historic Places in Santa Rosa County, Florida
Churches in Santa Rosa County, Florida
1867 establishments in Florida
Religious organizations established in 1867
Churches completed in 1878